Paraclete High School is a private Roman Catholic college preparatory high school in Lancaster, California, United States, affiliated with the Roman Catholic Archdiocese of Los Angeles. It was established in 1963. On May 24, 2011, Paraclete graduated its largest class yet with the Class of 2011, reaching 203 students.

Background
Paraclete was established in 1963 on the old Antelope Valley Fairgrounds on Avenue I. Paraclete held its first classes in September 1963, with 41 students and 3 faculty members. A year later freshmen and sophomores were welcomed to new classrooms on its current property. The school was officially dedicated on November 6, 1965, by Cardinal McIntyre. Paraclete held its first graduation in June 1967.

Alma mater
Paraclete, our Paraclete, Guardian of the Desert's door;
Leading us with rays of truth, toward a faith more sure.
Give us strength and vision pure that we may trod the pathway home.
Paraclete, Paraclete, our Paraclete.

Academics
The curriculum at Paraclete is college preparatory, giving special attention to meeting the UC admissions requirements. Each student is required to attend at least 6 classes a day, but students who wish can take an extra zero period class before school starts or after school. Paraclete offers 13 AP classes and many Pre AP and honors courses. Being a Catholic high school, Paraclete also requires 4 years of religion classes. Any student that maintains a 4.0 or higher GPA is eligible to be valedictorian during their senior graduation.

Community service
Because Paraclete is a Catholic high school, every student and their parents are required to do community service. Freshmen and sophomores are required to do ten hours of community service or 2 service projects every semester, while juniors and seniors are required to do 15 hours of community service or 3 service projects every semester. Paraclete also has many clubs that are community service-oriented, examples are Z Club and Key Club. The school holds two blood drives every year; many students and faculty donate blood.

Notable alumni
Todd Davis, NFL player
Darian Thompson, NFL player
Noah Gray-Cabey, Actor/Pianist

References

External links
Paraclete High School's official website
2007 Paraclete High School Educator of Distinction by the National Society of High School Scholars

Roman Catholic secondary schools in Los Angeles County, California
Educational institutions established in 1963
1963 establishments in California
Catholic secondary schools in California